Stephen Chambers (born 20 July 1968) is an English former professional footballer who played in the Football League for Mansfield Town.

References

1968 births
Living people
English footballers
Association football defenders
English Football League players
Sheffield Wednesday F.C. players
Mansfield Town F.C. players
Gateshead F.C. players
Boston United F.C. players
Matlock Town F.C. players